CD-118 or No. 118 was a Type D escort ship of the Imperial Japanese Navy during World War II.

History
She was laid down on 8 June 1944 at the Kobe shipyard of Kawasaki Shipyard Co., Ltd. for the benefit of the Imperial Japanese Navy and launched on 20 November 1944. On 27 December 1944, she was completed and commissioned. On 15 August 1945, Japan announced their unconditional surrender and she was turned over to the Allies. On 5 October 1945, she was removed from the Navy List. She was assigned to the Allied Repatriation Service and went on numerous repatriation journeys.

On 31 July 1947, she was ceded to the Republic of China as a war reparation and renamed Chieh 12.

In 1949, she was seized by forces of the People's Republic of China.

References

Bibliography

1944 ships
Ships built by Kawasaki Heavy Industries
Type D escort ships
Ships of the Republic of China Navy
Ships of the People's Liberation Army Navy
Naval ships of China